John Luther Crain (born 1960, in Franklinton, Louisiana) is an American accountant and academic administrator, currently serving as president of Southeastern Louisiana University, having been appointed to the position on February 17, 2009, by the Board of Supervisors of the University of Louisiana System. He succeeded Randy Moffett.

Education
Crain graduated from Franklinton High School in 1978, and later earned B.S. and MBA degrees from Southeastern Louisiana University. He then received a Ph.D. in accountancy from the University of Mississippi. He is an inactive CPA and an accomplished pianist.

Career
Crain previously served as interim president, provost, vice president for academic affairs, accounting department head, president of the Faculty Senate, and tenured professor of accounting. He began full-time employment as an assistant professor of accounting at Southeastern in 1987 and held his first administrative position as interim director of the university's Small Business Development Center. In 1992, Crain received the Southeastern President's Award for Excellence in Research. Crane has authored 63 articles in academic journals.

Notes

1960 births
Living people
American accountants
American classical pianists
American male classical pianists
American male organists
Heads of universities and colleges in the United States
Louisiana Republicans
People from Hammond, Louisiana
People from Franklinton, Louisiana
Southeastern Louisiana University
Southeastern Louisiana University alumni
University of Mississippi alumni
American United Methodists
20th-century American pianists
21st-century classical pianists
21st-century organists
20th-century American male musicians
21st-century American male musicians
21st-century American pianists
American organists